is a national highway connecting Tsuruga and Kyotamba in Japan.

Route data
Length: 139.9 km (86.9 mi)
Origin: Tsuruga (originates at junction with Route 8)
Terminus: Kyotamba (ends at junction with Route 9)
Major cities: Obama, Maizuru, Ayabe

History
4 December 1952- - First Class National Highway 27 (from Tsuruga to Kyotamba)
1 April 1965- - General National Highway 27 (from Tsuruga to Kyotamba)

Intersects with

Fukui Prefecture
Kyoto Prefecture

References

027
Roads in Fukui Prefecture
Roads in Kyoto Prefecture